Kobylnica  is a village in the administrative district of Gmina Maciejowice, within Garwolin County, Masovian Voivodeship, in east-central Poland.

The village has a population of 522.

References

Kobylnica